An equivalent of presidential election was held in the Socialist Republic of Romania between 6-9 December 1967.

On 6-8 December 1967, Romanian Communist Party held its National Conference in Bucharest. Chivu Stoica announced in the meeting of 7 December 1967 his resignation from the office of President of the State Council and a proposal that this office should be held by the same person that holds the office of General Secretary of the Romanian Communist Party.

On 8 December 1967, the old State Council of Romania held its last session. Its members voted secretly voted the new leadership.

On 9 December 1967, the Great National Assembly (Romania's Communist parliament) voted unanimously in favor of the new composition of the State Council. Nicolae Ceaușescu became the third president of the State Council of Romania, de facto Romanian head of state.

Candidates

References

President of the State Council election
Nicolae Ceaușescu